Balta Ialomiței is an island on the Danube, located in Ialomița County and Călărași County, Romania. It is surrounded by two branches of the Danube, named "Borcea" and "Dunărea Veche". Originally, a wetland, the island was covered with marshes, woods, lakes, and ponds, but some of the land was reclaimed for agriculture. Occasionally, some of these regions are still flooded. The A2 freeway passes through this island.

Gallery

Geography of Ialomița County
Geography of Călărași County
Islands of the Danube
River islands of Romania